The Socialist Propaganda League of America (SPLA) was established in 1915, apparently by C. W. Fitzgerald of Beverly, Massachusetts. The group was a membership organization established within the ranks of the Socialist Party of America (SPA) and is best remembered as  direct lineal antecedent of the Left Wing Section of the SPA and its governing National Council — the forerunner of the American Communist movement. It published a journal, The Internationalist, renamed The New International in 1917, last published in 1919.

Organizational history

Establishment

In the fall of 1915, C.W. Fitzgerald wrote and sent a leaflet to Vladimir Lenin of the Russian Social Democratic Workers Party. Lenin replied, outlining his views on the situation faced by the revolutionary socialist movement.

It was not until November 1916 that any sort of broad-based organization was established. A November 26, 1916, meeting in Boston approved a first manifesto for the organization and established an official journal, The Internationalist .The paper was launched in Boston at the start of January 1917 and continued under that name through April of that year. The initial editor of The Internationalist was John D. Williams.

According to the group's constitutional objectives, "The SPLA declares emphatically and will work uncompromisingly in the economic and political fields for industrial revolution to establish industrial democracy by the mass action of the working class."

Move to New York

In January 1917, editor Williams traveled to New York City in order to raise money for the Socialist Propaganda League and its newly launched paper. Williams made the acquaintance of a young Italian-American radical named Louis C. Fraina, until recently a key editor at the now-defunct magazine The New Review. Williams sought an experienced editor to take over the publication and a compact was made.

Beginning with an issue dated April 21, 1917, The Internationalist was moved to New York City and published by the Socialist Propaganda League as The New International. Louis Fraina became the publication's editor at that date. The publication was financed through donations made by Dutch engineer and left wing socialist S.J. Rutgers. Circulation was small, estimated by historian Theodore Draper at "no more than a thousand copies of each issue," which served to limit the paper's influence. Nevertheless, Draper and other historians of the American left regard The Internationalist and its successor as the first propaganda organs of the movement which congealed as the Left Wing Section of the Socialist Party in 1919 — forerunner of the American communist movement.

In January 1918, in the aftermath of the Bolshevik victory in Russia and the establishment of a Revolutionary Socialist regime there, the SPLA issue a second manifesto of the organization. The manifesto denounced "bourgeois democracy" as a "fraud" by means of which "Imperialism promotes the most brutal interests," advocated for "the unity of industrial action and Socialist politics," argued that "the revolution of the proletariat annihilates the parliamentary regime and its state" and instead establishes a new form of government based upon workers' councils that combine legislative and executive authority. The SPLA stated in this manifesto that "the organization is formed to work in the Socialist Party as well as independently of the party" and for "the revolutionary reorganization of the American Socialist movement" both from within and without the SPA.

The organization achieved a significant degree of public notice as leading exponents of the Bolshevik Revolution in the United States. On February 28, 1918, a mass meeting was held in a New York City hall at which Louis Fraina quixotically called for the establishment of a "Red Guard" of draft age men to be sent to Soviet Russia to fight for the Bolshevik government against the German army then invading the country. The meeting of about 2,000 people was also addressed by writer Andre Tridon as well as IWW poet Arturo Giovanitti.

Invitation to join the Communist International

The Socialist Propaganda League called for a new revolutionary socialist International and was invited by name to attend the founding Congress of the Communist International in 1919. The organization, however, was unable to send a representative in time to attend the gathering.

Dissolution and legacy

A total of 12 issues of The New International are known to have been produced through October 1918. The New International was directly succeeded by The Revolutionary Age, also edited by Fraina, with the first issue of that paper appearing in the middle of November. "The League is still in existence, but its paper is no longer published, since The Revolutionary Age expresses its policy," Fraina noted in March 1919.

Prominent members of the SPL joined the new Communist Party of America, which eventually merged with the Communist Labor Party to form first the Workers Party of America and eventually the Communist Party USA.

Key members

 C.W. Fitzgerald
 Louis C. Fraina
 John Jurgis
 Otto Huiswoud
 S.J. Rutgers
 John D. Williams

Publications
 "Letter to C.W. Fitzgerald in Beverly, Massachusetts, from N. Lenin (V.I. Ul'ianov) in Berne, Switzerland, November 1915," originally published in Lenin Collected Works, Fourth Edition. Moscow: Progress Publishers, vol. 21, pp. 423–428, here at the Marxists Internet Archive
 "Letter to C.W. Fitzgerald in Beverly, Massachusetts, from N. Lenin (V.I. Ul'ianov) in Berne, Switzerland, November 1915," PDF-Version of above from Tim Davenport's article in Marxist History with remarks on dating the letter
 "Manifesto of the Socialist Propaganda League of America (Adopted at a Meeting Held in the City of Boston, November 26, 1916)," International Socialist Review, vol. 17, no. 7 (January 1917), pp. 483–485.
 "Manifesto of the Socialist Propaganda League of America (January 1919)" Revolutionary Age, vol. 1, no. 21 (March 8, 1919), pg. 8.
 "Constitution of the Socialist Propaganda League of America," The Internationalist, vol. 1, no. 1 (January 6, 1918), pg. 2.

References

Further reading
 Paul Buhle, A Dreamer's Paradise Lost: Louis Fraina/Lewis Corey, 1892-1953. Atlantic Highlands. NJ: Humanities Press, 1995.
 Paul Buhle, Louis C. Fraina/Lewis Corey and The Crisis of the Middle Class. New Politics, vol. 5, no. 1 (new series), whole no. 17, Summer 1994.
 Christopher Phelps, "Out of the Fraina and into the Fire," American Quarterly, vol. 50, no. 2 (June 1998), pp. 424–431.
 "Barred Out of Hall: Anti-Conscription Socialists Speak to 1,000 in Street," New York Sun, June 1, 1917, pg. 1.
 "Ask Wilson's Leave to Fight for Russia: Harlem Socialists Move to Organize a "Red Guard" Here of Men Above Draft Age," New York Times, March 1, 1918; pg. 2.

External links
 Tim Davenport, "The Socialist Propaganda League of America (1915 - 1919): Organizational History," Early American Marxism website, www.marxisthistory.org/
 Tim Davenport and Marty Goodman (eds.), "The Internationalist and The New International: Index of issues," Marxists Internet Archive. —Downloadable pdfs of official SPLA newspapers.

1915 establishments in the United States
Factions of the Socialist Party of America
1919 disestablishments in the United States